Kursi is a village in Põltsamaa Parish, Jõgeva County in Estonia. Kursi has a population of 54 (as of 10 April 2006).

Kursi Church is a mixture of Baroque architecture and Gothic Revival architecture. It derives its present look due to alterations made by architect Johann Gottfired Mühlhausen.

Gallery

References

Villages in Jõgeva County
Kreis Dorpat